"You May Be Right" is a  song written and performed by rock singer Billy Joel, released as a single from his 1980 album Glass Houses. The single reached No. 7 on the US charts and No. 6 in Canada.  It failed to chart, however, in the UK unlike his preceding and succeeding singles "All for Leyna" (UK #40) and "It's Still Rock and Roll to Me" (UK #14). The Japanese single features "Close to the Borderline" as a B-side.

The song is the first track off the album and begins with the sound of broken glass, which is included to metaphorically signify the smashing of the glass house from which the album is named. "You May Be Right" is also on Billy Joel's Greatest Hits – Volume I & Volume II (on disc 2) and Live at Shea Stadium: The Concert albums.

Reception
Cash Box said that the song is "witty, urbane and energetic," and that the "hard guitar" playing is "reminiscent of Chuck Berry and the Rolling Stones." Record World said that "Joel's rock energy blends well with his pop melodies on this smashing cut."

Music video
The video version differs from the album version. The most notable difference is the intro, where the sound of broken glass is replaced with "one, two, one, two, three, four".

Personnel 
 Billy Joel – vocals, acoustic piano, harmonica
 Dave Brown – electric guitar
 Russell Javors – electric guitar
 Doug Stegmeyer – bass guitar
 Liberty DeVitto – drums, percussion
 Richie Cannata – saxophone solo

Charts

Weekly charts

Year-end charts

Certifications

References

1979 songs
1980 singles
Billy Joel songs
Southside Johnny & The Asbury Jukes songs
Songs written by Billy Joel
American new wave songs
Columbia Records singles
Song recordings produced by Phil Ramone
Songs about infidelity